John Jacob Lentz (January 27, 1856 – July 27, 1931) was an American lawyer and politician who served as a U.S. Representative from Ohio for two terms from 1897 to 1901.

Early life and career
Born near St. Clairsville, Belmont County, Ohio, Lentz attended the common schools and the St. Clairsville High School.
He was a school teacher for four years.
He graduated from the National Normal University, Lebanon, Ohio, in 1877 and then attended the University of Wooster in 1877 and 1878.
He graduated from the University of Michigan at Ann Arbor in 1882 and from Columbia Law School, New York City, in 1883.

He was admitted to the bar in Columbus, Ohio, in October 1883 and practiced. He was law partner with George K. Nash from 1887 until Nash's death in 1904.

He was the founder of the American Insurance Union in 1894 and was its president continuously from then until his death.
He was a trustee of Ohio University at Athens.

Congress 
Lentz was elected as a Democrat to the Fifty-fifth and Fifty-sixth Congresses (March 4, 1897 – March 3, 1901).
He was an unsuccessful candidate for re-election in 1900 to the Fifty-seventh Congress.

Later career 
He served as delegate to the Democratic National Convention in 1908.
He participated in campaigns in many States in support of the Eighteenth and Nineteenth amendments to the Constitution.

He retired from his law practice in 1915 and engaged in the insurance business.
Lentz was a member of the Board of Governors of the Loyal Order of Moose.

Death
He died in Columbus, Ohio, on July 27, 1931.
He was interred in Green Lawn Cemetery.

See also
American Insurance Union Citadel

References

Sources

1856 births
1931 deaths
Columbia Law School alumni
People from St. Clairsville, Ohio
Politicians from Columbus, Ohio
University of Michigan alumni
College of Wooster alumni
National Normal University alumni
Ohio University trustees
Burials at Green Lawn Cemetery (Columbus, Ohio)
Democratic Party members of the United States House of Representatives from Ohio